Chen Zhechao (born 19 April 1995) is a Chinese footballer who currently plays for Chinese Super League side Meizhou Hakka.

Club career
Chen Zhechao was promoted to Shandong Luneng's first team squad in 2016 after five years study in Portugal. On 15 April 2016, he made his debut for Shandong Luneng in the 2016 Chinese Super League against Yanbian FC, coming on as a substitute for Zhang Chi in the 63rd minute. He would play understudy to Zheng Zheng and Song Long for the left back position until on 21 January 2020 he was loaned out to fellow top tier club Guangzhou R&F to gain more playing time. He would make his debut for Guangzhou R&F in a league game on 26 July 2020, against Shenzhen F.C. in a 3-0 defeat. 

Upon his return to Shandong, Chen would still struggle to establish himself as a regular within the team and despite being part of the squad that won the 2021 Chinese Super League title, on 22 March 2022, Chen transferred to Chinese Super League club Meizhou Hakka. He would go on to make his debut in a league game on 4 June 2022 against Tianjin Jinmen Tiger in a 1-1 draw.

Career statistics
Statistics accurate as of match played 31 December 2022.

Honours

Club
Shandong Taishan
Chinese Super League: 2021 
Chinese FA Cup: 2021

References

External links
 

1995 births
Living people
Chinese footballers
Association football defenders
Footballers from Wuhan
Shandong Taishan F.C. players
Guangzhou City F.C. players
Meizhou Hakka F.C. players
Chinese Super League players
Chinese expatriate footballers
Expatriate footballers in Portugal
Chinese expatriate sportspeople in Portugal
Footballers at the 2018 Asian Games
Asian Games competitors for China
21st-century Chinese people